Mosaner is a surname. Notable people with the surname include: 

Amos Mosaner (born 1995), Italian curler 
Elena Mosaner, Russian-born American hypnotherapist, author, and filmmaker